Umm Al Qahab is a village in western Qatar located in the municipality of Al Khor. The village is near to Umm Birka. It is one of many scattered villages to the north-west of Al Thakhira.

Etymology
In Arabic, "umm" means "mother" and is commonly attached as a prefix to geographic features. The second word, "qahab", is a local term used for white and light grey hills, of which there are a number found in this area.

Alternative transliterations of its name are Umm Al Gahab and Umm Al Quhab.

Gallery

References

Populated places in Al Khor